The 2016 NCAA Division I women's volleyball tournament began on December 1, 2016 and concluded on December 17 at Nationwide Arena in Columbus, Ohio. The tournament field was determined on November 27, 2016. Stanford defeated Texas 3 sets to 1 in the final to claim their seventh title, tying them with Penn State for most all-time.

Qualifying teams
The champions of the NCAA's 32 conferences qualified automatically, while the remaining 32 positions were filled with at-large selections. The Big Ten and Pac-12 led all conferences with eight teams each in the field, followed by the Big 12, which placed six teams.

Records

Bracket
The first two rounds are held on campus sites (the home court of the seeded team). Regional semifinals and finals will be held at four non-predetermined campus sites, which will be announced after play concludes, on December 3.

Lincoln Regional

Schedule

First round

Second round

Regional semifinals

Regional Final

Austin Regional

Schedule

First round

Second round

Regional semifinals

Regional Final

Madison Regional

Schedule

First round

Second round

Regional semifinals

Regional Final

Minneapolis Regional

Schedule

First round

Second round

Regional semifinals

Regional Final

Final Four
National semifinal and championship were held at Nationwide Arena, in Columbus, Ohio on December 15 and 17 respectively. The national semifinal matches, originally scheduled to be broadcast on ESPN2, were moved to ESPN.

National semifinals

National Championship

Record by conference

The columns R32, S16, E8, F4, CM, and NC respectively stand for the Round of 32,Sweet Sixteen, Elite Eight, Final Four, Championship Match, and National Champion.

References

NCAA Women's Volleyball Championship
 
2016 in sports in Ohio
Volleyball in Ohio
December 2016 sports events in the United States
Sports competitions in Columbus, Ohio